Mark Chester Ebersole (November 3, 1921 – February 12, 2011) was an American academic, a former professor and President of Elizabethtown College.

Ebersole became President of Elizabethtown College in 1977 and retired in 1985.

Education 
B.A. Elizabethtown College, 1943
M.A. History, University of Pennsylvania, 1948
Ph.D. Religion, Columbia University, 1952

References

Presidents of Elizabethtown College
1921 births
2011 deaths
Elizabethtown College alumni